Penthaleus is a genus of earth mites in the family of Penthaleidae, first described by Carl Ludwig Koch in 1835.

They are a major winter pest of a variety of crops and pastures in southern Australia.

There are just four species which occur in Australia:

 Penthaleus falcatus Qin & Halliday, 1996
 Penthaleus major (Dugès, 1834)
 Penthaleus minor (Canestrini, 1886)
 Penthaleus tectus Halliday, 2005

References

Trombidiformes genera
Taxa named by Carl Ludwig Koch
Taxa described in 1835
Trombidiformes